The Joe Bauman Home Run Award, formerly known as the Round-Tripper-Award, is given to the Minor League Baseball player who hit the most regular season home runs that year. The award, first given in 2002, is named after Joe Bauman, who set a then–professional record with 72 home runs in 1954, while playing for the Roswell Rockets of the Class-C Longhorn League.

The award was named for Bauman in 2004. It is presented by Musco Lighting at the Baseball Winter Meetings each December. The winner receives a check worth $200 for every home run hit. The most recent winner of the award is MJ Melendez of the Kansas City Royals organization.

Winners

Notes
Jones and Jon Gaston tied with 35 home runs. Jones was declared the winner by virtue of having more runs batted in (RBIs) than Gaston (103 to 100).
Moustakas and Mark Trumbo tied with 36 home runs. Moustakas was declared the winner by virtue of having more RBIs than Trumbo (124 to 122).
Alonso and Ibandel Isabel tied with 36 home runs. Alonso was declared the winner by virtue of having more RBIs than Isabel (119 to 78).

See also

Minor league baseball awards
Babe Ruth Home Run Award
Mel Ott Award

References

External links

Awards established in 2002
Minor league baseball trophies and awards
2002 establishments in the United States